Sri Lankamalleswara Wildlife Sanctuary is a wildlife sanctuary headquartered in Kadapa, Andhra Pradesh, India. It is the only habitat in the world which provides home for the Jerdon's courser highly endangered bird species. In addition to that it is also a home to nearly 176 families of vegetation and living organisms. After the rediscovery of Jerdon's courser, the area of discovery was declared as Lankamaleswara wildlife sanctuary.

History
The Sanctuary is well known for its habitation of the Jerdon's courser which is a critically endangered species. The bird was first discovered in 1848 by the surgeon-naturalist Thomas C. Jerdon and was thought to be extinct until its rediscovery in 1986. The bird now inhabits the sparse scrub regions and forests of the Sri Lanka Malleshwara Sanctuary where the topography and weather conditions are compatible with its existence.

Flora and fauna
The Sanctuary provides a home to nearly 1400 plant species and nearly 176 families of vegetation and living organisms. It has dry deciduous mixed thorn forests with deep gorges and steep slopes. Red Sanders, an endemic species, can be found here. Its fauna includes the panther, sloth bear, cheetal, sambar, chowsingha, chinkara, nilgai, wild boar, fox and the Jerdon's courser.

Visiting season
Though tourists are allowed to visit the sanctuary any time of the year, the best visiting period is between October to March. The sanctuary can be reached easily. It is only 15 km far from the city of Kadapa which also has the nearest airport.
Accessibility: 60 km. by road from Cuddapah railway station.
Accommodation: Forest rest house at Siddavotam & Cuddapah.
Season: October to March.

References

External links

Wildlife sanctuaries in Andhra Pradesh
Kadapa district
Protected areas with year of establishment missing